Srijem, Koprivnica-Križevci County  is a village in Croatia.

Populated places in Koprivnica-Križevci County